The 2018 Olt County name referendum was a referendum held in the Olt County in Romania to rename the unit to "Olt-Romanați County" in 6 and 7 October 2018. This referendum was demanded by the inhabitants of the former Romanați County, especially those of its former capital Caracal, as they said it was to defend their identity and to remember the abolished county. The referendum did not attempt to enforce any administrative changes, only changes in the county's name. For it to pass, the voter turnout had to be of 30% or more out of the approximately 300,000 people eligible to vote in the Olt County at the time and the results had to be of 50%+1 votes or more saying "yes".

The referendum was held at the same time as the 2018 Romanian constitutional referendum, which sought to prohibit same-sex marriage in Romania, reason for which Olt County voters were given two ballots. The referendum cost about 900,000 Romanian lei, which was seen as an unnecessary expense by many locals.

Although the referendum was originally scheduled for 15 October 2017, it was held in the end in 6 and 7 October 2018. The question of the referendum was the following: "Do you agree with the assignment of the name Olt-Romanați to the Olt County?". Around 369,000 people signed up for the Olt County's voting lists. The turnout was 27.19%, so the referendum failed. The nationwide referendum regarding same-sex marriage also failed for the same reason. Unlike the nationwide referendum, no official data was released for the Olt County one.

See also
 2017 Nagorno-Karabakh constitutional referendum, a referendum which involved a name change
 2018 Macedonian referendum, another referendum which involved a name change

References

Olt County
Olt County
Referendums in Romania
Referendum
October 2018 events in Romania